Gubernatorial elections were held in American Samoa on 8 November 1977, with a run-off between the top two candidates on 22 November. Peter Tali Coleman was elected with 56% of the vote in the second round.

Candidates
Former appointed governor Peter Tali Coleman ran with Tufele Liamatua as his running mate for lieutenant governor. The territory's delegate at-large A. P. Lutali ran with Fofō Iosefa Fiti Sunia, a Senator. Former delegate at-large A. U. Fuimaono ran alongside Senator Lutu T. S. Fuimaono.

Results

References

American
Elections in American Samoa
Gubernatorial
Election and referendum articles with incomplete results